The 1980–81 Fresno State Bulldogs men's basketball team represented California State University, Fresno during the 1980–81 NCAA Division I men's basketball season. This was head coach Boyd Grant's fourth season at Fresno State. The Bulldogs played their home games at Selland Arena and were members of the Pacific Coast Athletic Association. They finished the season 25–4, 12–2 in PCAA play to win the conference regular season title. They defeated  to win the PCAA tournament and earn the conference's automatic bid to the NCAA tournament. The Bulldogs were upset in the opening round by Northeastern, 55–53.

Roster

Schedule and results

|-
!colspan=9 style=| Regular season

|-
!colspan=9 style=| PCAA Tournament

|-
!colspan=9 style=| NCAA Tournament

Rankings

NBA Draft

References 

Fresno State Bulldogs men's basketball seasons
Fresno State
Fresno State Bulldogs men's bask
Fresno State Bulldogs men's bask
Fresno State